The Government of California's executive branch includes numerous types of entities such as departments, commissions, boards, panels, bureaus, and offices. The generic term for any entity is "department". Most entities are grouped together to form "superagencies", which are led by a secretary of the Governor's Cabinet. Thus, department directors report to a cabinet secretary. The seven superagencies are Government Operations; Labor and Workforce Development; Transportation; Natural Resources; Environmental Protection; Health and Human Services; and Business, Consumer Services, and Housing. The CA Department of Food and Agricultural (CDFA) and the CA Department of Corrections and Rehabilitation (CDCR) are also led by secretaries, not department directors. Several departments, such as CDFA and CDCR, report directly to the Governor and their chief executive officers are members of the Governor's cabinet. Lastly, several departments are led by a constitutional executive officer who is elected separately from the Governor, e.g. the CA Department of Justice (Attorney-General) and the CA Department of Insurance (Insurance Commissioner). 
			
 Accountancy, California Board of (CBA)	
 Achieving a Better Life Experience	
 Acupuncture Board	
 Administrative Hearings, Office of	
 Administrative Law, Office of (OAL)	
 Aging, California Commission on (CCoA)	
 Aging, California Department of (CDA)	
 Agricultural Labor Relations Board (ALRB)	
 Air Resources Board (ARB, CARB)	
 Alcoholic Beverage Control Appeals Board (ABCAB)	
 Alcoholic Beverage Control, Department of (ABC)	
 Allocation Board, State	
 Alternative Energy and Advanced Transportation Financing Authority, California	
 Apprenticeship Council, California	
 Arbitration Certification Program	
 Architects Board, California	
 Arts Council, California (CAC)	
 Assembly, California State	
 Athletic Commission, California State (CSAC)	
 Auditor, California State (BSA)	
 Automotive Repair, Bureau of (BAR)	
 Baldwin Hills Conservancy (BHC)	
 Bar of California, State (CALBAR)	
 Barbering and Cosmetology, Board of (BBC)	
 Behavioral Sciences, Board of (BBS)	
 Biodiversity Council, California (CBC)	
 Boating and Waterways Commission, California	
 Building Standards Commission, California (BSC)	
 Financial Protection and Innovation, California Department of (DBO)
 Business and Economic Development, Governor's Office of	
 Business, Consumer Services, and Housing Agency, California (BCSH)		
 Cannabis Control, Bureau of	
 Cemetery and Funeral Bureau (CFB)	
 Central Valley Flood Protection Board (CVFPB)	
 Child Support Services, Department of (CDCSS)	
 Chiropractic Examiners, Board of (BCE)	
 Citizens Compensation Commission, California	
 Citizens Redistricting Commission (CRC)	
 Coachella Valley Mountains Conservancy (CVMC)	
 Coastal Commission, California	
 Coastal Conservancy, California	
 Colorado River Board of California (CRB)	
 Community Colleges System, California (CCCS)	
 Community Services & Development, Department of (CSD)	
 Compensation Insurance Fund, State (SCIF)	
 Conservation Corps, California (CCC)	
 Conservation, Department of (DOC)	
 Consumer Affairs, Department of (DCA)	
 Contractors State License Board (CSLB)	
 Controller's Office, California State (SCO)		
 Cool California		
 Corrections & Rehabilitation, Department of (CDCR)	
 Counties, California State Association of (CSAC)	
 Court Reporters Board of California	
 Courts, California
Debt Limit Allocation Committee, California
 Debt and Investment Advisory Commission, California
 Delta Protection Commission
 Delta Stewardship Council	
 Dental Board of California (DBC)	
 Dental Hygiene Committee of California (DHCC)	
 Developmental Disabilities, State Council on (SCDD)	
 Developmental Services, Department of (DDS)	
 Disabled Veterans Business Enterprise Advisory Council (DVBE)	
 Earthquake Authority, California	
 Education, California State Board of	
 Education, Department of (CDE)	
 Educational Facilities Authority, California	
 Electronic & Appliance Repair, Home Furnishings, and Thermal Insulation Bureau of (BEAR)	
 Emergency Medical Services Authority (EMSA)	
 Emergency Services, Governor's Office of (CalOES)	
 Employment Development Department (EDD)	
 Employment Training Panel (ETP)	
 Energy Commission, California (ENERGY)	
 Engineers, Land Surveyors, and Geologists, Board of Professional	
 Environmental Health Hazard Assessment, Office of (OEHHA)	
 Environmental Protection Agency (CALEPA)	
 Equalization, Board of (BOE)	
 Exposition & State Fair, California (CAL EXPO)	
 Fair Employment & Housing, Department of (DFEH)	
 Fair Political Practices Commission (FPPC)	
 Film Commission, California (CFC)	
 Finance, Department of (DOF)	
 Financing Coordinating Committee, California	
 Fire Marshal, Office of the State	
 First 5 California (First 5)	
 Fish & Game Commission (FGC)	
 Fish & Wildlife, Department of (CDFW)	
 Food & Agriculture, Department of (CDFA)	
 Forestry & Fire Protection, Board of (BOF)	
 Forestry & Fire Protection, California Department of (CAL FIRE)	
 Franchise Tax Board (FTB)	
 Gambling Control Commission (CGCC)	
 General Services, Department of (DGS)	
 Government Operations Agency
 Governor, Office of the (GO)	
 Guide Dogs for the Blind, Board of (BGDB)
 Health and Human Services Agency (CHHS)	
 Health Benefit Exchange, California (HBEX)	
 Health Care Services, Department of (DHCS)	
 Health Facilities Financing Authority, California	
 Health Information Integrity, California Office of (CALOHI)	
 Health Planning and Development, Office of Statewide (OSHPD)	
 Health and Safety and Workers' Compensation, Commission on	
 Healthy Food Financing Initiative Council, California	
 High-Speed Rail Authority (CAHSRA)	
 Highway Patrol, California (CHP)	
 Historical Records Advisory Board, California	
 Historical Resources Commission, State (SHRC)	
 Horse Racing Board, California (CHRB)	
 Hospitals, Department of State	
 Housing & Community Development, Department of (HCD)
 Housing Finance Agency (CALHFA)	
 Human Resources, Department of (CalHR)
 Independent Living Council, California State (CALSILC)	
 Industrial Development Financing Advisory Commission, California	
 Industrial Relations, Department of (DIR)	
 Industrial Welfare Commission (IWC)
 Infrastructure and Economic Development Bank (I-Bank) (IBANK)	
 Inspector General, Office of the (OIG)
 Insurance, Department of (CDI)	
 Judicial Performance, Commission on (CJP)	
 Justice, Department of (DOJ)	
 Juvenile Parole Board (JPB)	
 Labor and Workforce Development Agency (LWDA)	
 Lands Commission, California State (SLC)	
 Landscape Architects Technical Committee (LATC)	
 Law Revision Committee (CLRC)	
 Legislative Analyst's Office (LAO)	
 Legislature, California State (LEGISLATURE)	
 Library, California State (CSL)	
 Lieutenant Governor, Office of (LTG)	
 Little Hoover Commission (LHC)	
 Lottery, California (LOTTERY)
 Managed Health Care, Department of (DMHC)	
 Medical Board of California (MBC)	
 Mental Health Services Oversight and Accountability Commission (MHSOAC)	
 Mentally Ill Offenders, Council on (COMIO)	
 Military Department, California	
 Mining & Geology Board, State (SMGB)	
 Motor Vehicles, Department of (DMV)	
 Native American Heritage Commission (NAHC)	
 Natural Resources Agency, California 	
 Naturopathic Medicine Committee	
 New Motor Vehicle Board (NMVB)	
 Occupational Safety and Health Appeals Board (DIR, OSHAB)	
 Occupational Therapy, California Board of (BOT)	
 Ocean Protection Council (OPC)	
 Optometry, Board of	
 Osteopathic Medical Board of California (OMBC)	
 Parks and Recreation, California Department of
 Parks and Recreation Commission, California State (PARKS)		
 Parole Hearings, Board of (CDCR, BOPH)	
 Patient Advocate, Office of the (OPA)	
 Peace Officer Standards & Training, Commission on (POST)	
 Personnel Board, State (SPB)	
 Pesticide Regulation, Department of (CDPR)	
 Pharmacy, California State Board of	
 Physical Therapy Board of California (PTBC)	
 Physician Assistant Board 	
 Pilot Commissioners for the Bays of San Francisco, San Pablo, and Suisun, Board of (BOPC)	
 Planning and Research, Governor's Office of (OPR)	
 Podiatric Medicine, Board of (BPM)	
 Pollution Control Financing Authority, California	
 Pooled Money Investment Board	
 Prison Industry Authority (CALPIA)	
 Private and Postsecondary Education, Bureau for (BPPE)	
 Professional Fiduciaries Bureau	
 Psychology, Board of	
 Public Employees Retirement System, California (CalPERS)	
 Public Employment Relations Board, California (PERB)	
 Public Health, California Department of (CDPH)	
 Public Utilities Commission, California (CPUC)	
 Real Estate Appraisers, Bureau of (OREA)	
 Real Estate, Department of (DRE)	
 Regenerative Medicine, California Institute for (CIRM)	
 Registered Nursing, Board of (RN)	
 Rehabilitation, Department of (DOR)	
 Resources Recycling and Recovery, Department of	
 Respiratory Care Board of California (RCB)	
 Sacramento-San Joaquin Delta Conservancy	
 San Diego River Conservancy (SDRC)	
 San Francisco Bay Conservation & Development Commission (BCDC)	
 San Gabriel and Lower Los Angeles Rivers and Mountains Conservancy (RMC)	
 San Joaquin River Conservancy (SJRC)	
 Santa Monica Mountains Conservancy (SMMC)	
 Save Our Water	
 Scholarshare Investment Board	
 School Finance Authority, California	
 Secretary of State, California (SOS)	
 Security and Investigative Services, Bureau of (BSIS)	
 Seismic Safety Commission, California (SSC)	
 Senate, California State	
 Sierra Nevada Conservancy	
 Social Services, Department of (CDSS)	
 Speech-Language Pathology and Audiology and Hearing Aid Dispensers Board	
 State Mandates, Commission on (CSM)	
 Status of Women and Girls, California Commission on the 
 Structural Pest Control Board	
 Student Aid Commission, California (CSAC)	
 Systems Integration, Office of (OSI)	
 Tahoe Conservancy, California	
 Tax Credit Allocation Committee, California	
 Tax and Fee Administration, California 		
 Teacher Credentialing, Commission on (CTC)	
 Technology, Department of
Telemetry Integrity and Modifications Enforcement Agency (TIME Agency)
 Toxic Substances Control, California Department of (DTSC)	
 Traffic Safety, California Office of (OTS)	
 Transportation Agency, California State	
 Transportation Commission, California (CTC)	
 Transportation, Department of (DOT, CALTRANS)	
 Treasurer's Office, State (STO)	
 Tribal Advisor, Governor's Office of	
 Unemployment Insurance Appeals Board (CUIAB)	
 Uniform Custom Cost Accounting Commission (SCO)	
 University of California (UC)
 University, California State (CALSTATE, CSU)	
 Veterans Affairs, Department of (CalVet)		
 Veterans Board, California		
 Veterinary Medical Board, California (VMB)	
 Victim Compensation Board, California (CalVCB)	
 Visit California 	
 Vocational Nursing and Psychiatric Technicians, Board of (BVNPT)	
 Volunteers, California	
 Water Commission, California	
 Water Quality Monitoring Council, California	
 Water Resources, Department of (DWR)	
 Water Resources Control Board, State (WRCB)	
 Wildlife Conservation Board (WCB)	
 Worker's Compensation Appeals Board	
 Workforce Development Board, California (CWDB)

See also
 Main California state government agencies
 List of California fire departments

References

External links
State of California - Official website
California State Government Organization   - Chart showing a hierarchy of the above departments and commissions
California State Agency Databases  - Comprehensive list of state agencies and databases maintained by the American Library Association

 List of State of California agencies, departments, and commissions
Agencies, departments, and commissions
California